Lauren Wells (born 3 July 1988) is a football goalkeeper from Reading who plays for the Welsh national team and Bristol Ladies Union.

Club career
Wells joined her local club Reading Royals aged ten. At 16 she moved on to Arsenal and spent two years studying at the Academy and featuring for the first team as Emma Byrne's back-up. Wells moved away to the University of Bath in 2006 and began playing for Cardiff City. Despite playing for Cardiff in the UEFA Women's Cup, Wells moved on to Bristol City Ladies after three months, in search of first-team football. Bristol City came under the auspices of Team Bath in 2007 and Wells continued as the number one goalkeeper at the club.

With the demise of Team Bath, Wells joined Bristol Academy in 2009, making her debut against Birmingham City.

In 2011–12 Wells turned out for South West Combination Women's Football League outfit Gloucester City. In summer 2012 Wells signed for Bristol Ladies Union FC, playing under Head Coach Rich Sears.

International career
Wells represented England at U17 level, but switched her allegiance to Wales and won 11 caps for the U19 team.

She was called into the Wales senior squad in March 2004 for that year's Algarve Cup while still a 15-year-old schoolgirl player with Reading. She made her international debut against Finland in a 4–0 defeat on 20 March 2004.

Wells also represented Great Britain at the World University Games, playing in the 2009 tournament in Belgrade and winning a bronze medal.

References

External links
Lauren Wells at UEFA
Lauren Wells at FAW

1988 births
Living people
Sportspeople from Reading, Berkshire
Bristol Academy W.F.C. players
Arsenal W.F.C. players
English women's footballers
Wales women's international footballers
FA Women's National League players
Welsh women's footballers
Women's association football goalkeepers
Universiade bronze medalists for Great Britain
Universiade medalists in football
Medalists at the 2009 Summer Universiade
Footballers from Berkshire